The Health Insurance Commission Act 1973 is an  Act of the Parliament of Australia. It was passed into Australian law in the Joint Sitting of the Australian Parliament of 1974.

References

External links
 Full text of the Act at Australasian Legal Information Institute website

Acts of the Parliament of Australia
1973 in Australian law
Health insurance in Australia